The Haitian Revolution (1791-1804) and the subsequent emancipation of Haiti as an independent state provoked mixed reactions in the United States. Among many white Americans, this led to uneasiness, instilling fears of racial instability on its own soil and possible problems with foreign relations and trade between the two countries. Among enslaved black Americans, it fueled hope that the principles of the recent American Revolution might be realized in their own liberation.

While the Haitian Revolution was occurring during the presidencies of George Washington and John Adams, members of the Federalist Party including Alexander Hamilton supported Toussaint Louverture and his revolution. John Adams appointed Edward Stevens as US consul-general to Haiti to forge a closer relationship between the two nations and express US support for Louverture's government. Alexander Hamilton assisted in drafting the constitution of Haiti and he advocated for closer diplomatic and economic relations between Haiti and the United States.

The U.S. started to become less diplomatic to Haiti under the presidency of Thomas Jefferson. Thomas Jefferson recognized that the revolution had the potential to cause an upheaval against slavery in the US not only by slaves, but by white abolitionists as well. Southern slaveholders feared the revolt might spread from the island of Hispaniola to their own plantations. Against this background and with the declared primary goal of maintaining social order in Haiti, the US, refused acknowledgement of Haitian independence until 1862.

The US also embargoed trade with the nascent state. American merchants had conducted a substantial trade with the plantations on Hispaniola throughout the 18th century, the French-ruled territory providing nearly all of its sugar and coffee. However, once the Haitian slave population emancipated itself, the US was reluctant to continue trade for fear of upsetting the evicted French on one hand and its Southern slaveholders on the other.

Despite this, there were anti-slavery advocates in northern cities who believed that consistency with the principles of the American Revolution — life, liberty and equality for all — demanded that the US support the Haitian people.

One outcome of the Haitian Revolution for the United States of America was the Louisiana Purchase. Having lost his control of the Caribbean landholding, Napoleon saw no further use for Louisiana. The US was only interested in the New Orleans area; however, the revolution enabled the sale of the entire territory west of the Mississippi River for around $15 million. This purchase more than doubled US territory.

Perception of the enslaved
In the 1998 documentary series Africans in America: America's Journey Through Slavery Douglas R. Egerton of the Le Moyne College Department of History said,

Government policy

Under Washington and Adams
When the news of the August 1791 slave revolt in Saint-Domingue (the name of the French colony which would become Haiti) reached then-President Washington, he immediately sent aid to the white government there. Then-US Secretary of the Treasury Alexander Hamilton and other Federalists supported Toussaint Louverture's revolution against France in Haiti, which had originated as a slave revolt. Hamilton's suggestions helped shape the Haitian constitution. In 1804 when Haiti became the Western Hemisphere's first independent state with a majority of the population being black, Hamilton urged closer economic and diplomatic ties.

Hamilton and Timothy Pickering worked to convince John Adams to appoint Edward Stevens as the United States consul-general in Saint-Domingue (later Haiti) from 1799 to 1800. Adams sent Stevens to Haiti with instructions to establish a relationship with Toussaint and express support for his regime. The Federalist administration hoped to incite a movement toward Haitian independence, but Louverture maintained a colonial relationship with France. Stevens's title, "consul", suggested a diplomat attached to a country not a colony, reflecting the Adams administration's view of the Haitian situation. Following his arrival in Haiti in April 1799, Stevens succeeded in accomplishing several of his objectives, including: the suppression of privateers operating out of the colony, protections for American lives and property, and right of entry for American vessels. Stevens pushed for similar privileges for the British, who, like the United States were engaged in conflict with France. Negotiations between Haiti and Britain were difficult given Haitian apprehension about a possible British invasion and Britain's fears of the revolt leading to unrest in the British West Indies. Stevens was forced to serve as the British agent for a period since the Haitians remained opposed to allowing a British official to land in the colony. The convention, signed on June 13, 1799, continued an armistice among the three parties and gave protections to British and American merchantmen from Haitian privateers, in addition to allowing American and British ships to enter Haiti and engage in free trade.

Under Jefferson and afterward
In 1791, Thomas Jefferson talked about gradual emancipation of US slaves in his private correspondence with friends while publicly remaining silent on the issue. However, by the time that the revolution was coming to an end and the debate over an embargo began, Jefferson's attitude shifted to fully avoiding the issue.  Louis Andre Pichon, the chargé d’affaires of France, felt that Jefferson would help to put down the slaves due to the fear of black rebellion in the US. Jefferson had, in fact, pledged to help starve out Toussaint Louverture, Haïti's rebel leader, but due to fears of the ambitions of Napoleon Bonaparte Jefferson refrained from such action.

Haïti attempted to establish closer ties with the US during the Jefferson administration, but this was difficult to do, in part because of the massacres of French whites in Haïti by Jean-Jacques Dessalines in the 1804 Haiti Massacre.  Dessalines sent a letter to Thomas Jefferson calling for closer ties between the two nations but Jefferson ignored the letter.

Jefferson had wanted to align with the European powers in an effort to isolate Haïti, but was unsuccessful due to Britain's lack of interest in joining the proposed accord.  France pressured for the end of American trade with Haïti, which they saw as aiding a rogue element in their colony.  Jefferson agreed to cease trade in arms, but would not give up trade for noncontraband goods.  Madison, commenting on the agreement to discontinue the arms trade, said that "it is probably the interest of all nations that they should be kept out of hands likely to make so bad use of them."  The debate on an embargo on Haïti heated up in Congress and civil society, but it was not all one-sided. Federalist newspaper Columbian Centinel compared the Haitian revolution and the struggle for independence from a European power, with the Americans' own revolution for independence.

However, in Congress, the proponents of an embargo had the clear advantage. Many white people in the South thought Jefferson's neutrality went too far and was equivalent to full-scale relations with Haïti. While such white people ignored oppression, exploitation and atrocities against enslaved Africans by white slave-traders, and by white slave-owners in Haiti and the USA (and indeed, carried out such abuses themselves), they were adamantly against reaching an agreement with people who had committed atrocities against whites, including white women and children. In parallel to the killings, plundering and rape also occurred. Women and children were generally killed last. White women were "often raped or pushed into forced marriages under threat of death. When George Logan introduced a bill that would outlaw all trade with Saint-Domingue that was not under French control, it signalled a shift to the side of the hard-liners. Weapons could only be aboard ships for their own protection, and any violators of the embargo would lose their cargo as well as their ships. The embargo bill introduced by George Logan was adopted in February 1806, and then renewed again the next year, until it expired in April 1808. Another embargo had been adopted in 1807 and this one lasted until 1810, though trade did not again take place until the 1820s. Despite this, official recognition did not happen until 1862, after the southern states had seceded from the US.

Fears and racial animus of white Southerners
In the South, white planters viewed the revolution as a large-scale slave revolt and feared that violence in Haïti could inspire similar events in the US. Haiti had an official policy of accepting any black person who arrived on their shores as a citizen.

The legislatures of Pennsylvania and South Carolina, as well as the Washington administration, dispatched aid to French colonists in Saint-Domingue.  In the debate over whether the US should embargo Haiti after it became independent, John Taylor of Virginia spoke for much of the popular sentiment of white people in the South.  To him the Haitian revolution was evidence for the idea that "slavery should be permanent in the United States."  He argued against the idea that slavery had caused the revolution, by instead suggesting that "the antislavery movement had provoked the revolt in the first place."  According to historian Tim Matthewson, John Taylor's comments in the debate shows how white attitudes shifted in the south from one of reluctantly accepting slavery as a necessity, to one of seeing it as a fundamental aspect of southern culture and the slave-owning planter class.  As the years progressed Haiti only became a bigger target for scorn amongst the pro-slavery factions in the south.  It was taken as proof that "violence was an inherent part of the character of blacks" due to the slaughtering of French whites, and the authoritarian rule that followed the end of the revolution.

See also
 Atlantic slave trade
 Slavery in the French West Indies
 Haitian Revolution
 Haiti–United States relations
 France and the American Civil War

Notes

References

Further reading

Haitian Revolution
Slavery in Haiti
Haitian Revolution
Haitian Revolution
Haitian Revolution